Devinder Gupta (born: 4 April 1943) is an Indian Judge and former Chief Justice of Andhra Pradesh High Court.

Career
Gupta hails from Shimla. After completion of LL.B. he started work as an advocate on 23 March 1967. Initially he practiced in the District Courts of Himachal Pradesh and the High Court. On 25 June 1990, Gupta was appointed an additional Judge of the Himachal Pradesh High Court. Thereafter he was transferred to Delhi High Court in 1994. Gupta also served as acting Chief Justice in Delhi High Court different times. He became the Executive Chairman of Delhi State Legal Services Authority. Justice Gupta was promoted to the post of Chief Justice of Andhra Pradesh High Court on 10 March 2003 and retired on 4 April 2005 from the post.

References

1943 births
Living people
Indian judges
Judges of the Delhi High Court
Chief Justices of the Andhra Pradesh High Court
20th-century Indian judges
21st-century Indian judges
People from Shimla
Judges of the Himachal Pradesh High Court